WPER is a Christian adult contemporary formatted broadcast radio station licensed to Fredericksburg, Virginia, United States, serving Fredericksburg and Richmond. WPER is simulcast over a network of stations and translators across Virginia. WPER is owned and operated by Baker Family Stations.

Call sign
On February 13, 2018, Baker Family Stations swapped the long-time call sign for their Fredericksburg station, WJYJ, with the call sign for their Hickory, NC station, WPIR. A week later, Baker again swapped the now-WPIR's call sign with that of sister station WPER.

Translators
In addition to its primary signal, WPER is relayed by six FM translators to widen its broadcast area across Virginia.

References

External links
 WPER Online
 

1984 establishments in Virginia
Contemporary Christian radio stations in the United States
Radio stations established in 1984
PER